Z. elegans may refer to:
 Zephyranthes elegans, a flowering plant native to Bolivia
 Zinnia elegans, the common zinnia or youth-and-old-age, a flowering plant
 Zodarion elegans, a spider found in Southern Europe and Northern Africa

Synonyms 
 Zigadenus elegans, a synonym for Anticlea elegans, the mountain deathcamas, elegant camas or alkali grass, a plant found in North America